Alfredo "El Salsero" Escalera (born March 21, 1952) is a Puerto Rican who was a world champion boxer. A native of Carolina, his nickname was "Salsero" because he was a fan of Salsa music.

Early boxing career
Escalera had his first professional bout on September 4, 1970, against Bob Payzant, in Portland. He won by a knockout in round four. He would suffer his first defeat in his third fight, when faced against Doug McClendon, who beat him by a decision in six rounds on January 26, 1971, in New York. He won five bouts in a row, and then lost by decision in eight rounds to future world title challenger Edwin Viruet.

He began 1972 by losing to another future world title challenger, Diego Alcala, by knockout in round eight, but he won his three other fights that year.

In 1973, he began, once again, by losing to another future world title challenger, Miguel Montilla, by a decision in ten rounds. Before the year was over, however, he was able to avenge that defeat, defeating Montilla by a knockout in round eight, and he won seven of his eight other fights that year.

By 1974, he began climbing up the super featherweight rankings, going 8-2 that year. He beat his own future world title challenger Sigfredo Rodriguez by a knockout in round one, and former world champion Ricardo Arredondo by a disqualification in round eight.

Champion
On July 4, 1975, he fought the WBC super featherweight champion Kuniaki Shibata in Mito, Japan, knocking Shibata out in round two to become the WBC super featherweight champion. Coincidentally, Escalera won his world title the same day that Angel Espada won the WBA world Welterweight championship at a fight that took place in Puerto Rico; this was the first time two Puerto Ricans became world champions the same day and as a consequence, Puerto Rico, a country that had only produced two world boxing champions in its history, doubled their number of champions in one day with Escalera and Espada's victories. (In Spanish)

Escalera became a household name in Puerto Rico during his tenure as world champion. He appeared in television commercials and was a popular public figure.

He defended his title ten times, including wins over Ray Lunny, Sigfredo Rodriguez and Tyrone Everett.  Most observers consider the Everett "win" as one of the worst decisions in boxing history, as it appeared that Everett clearly won.  A rematch was being negotiated when Everett was murdered.

Escalera lost his title on January 28, 1978, to Alexis Argüello of Nicaragua by a technical knockout in round 13 in Bayamón. In this fight, Escalera suffered a broken nose and tooth, a cut on his tongue and above his left eye, and a closed right eye before submitting to Argüello. The first Arguello-Escalera encounter has been dubbed as "The Bloody Battle of Bayamon". The fight was described as "brutal".

Post-championship career
Escalera and Argüello had a rematch, on February 4, 1979, in Rimini, and Escalera held a small lead on the judges' cards after 12 rounds. However, he was knocked out in round 13 by Argüello. Shortly after drawing (tying) with Antonio Cruz in ten rounds in October of that year, he announced his retirement.

In 1980, Escalera dedicated himself to the sport of professional wrestling, competing on the Puerto Rican professional wrestling circuit. However, in 1981, he launched a boxing comeback. He lost to future world light welterweight champion Gene Hatcher in San Antonio, but he beat former world title challenger Maurice Termite Watkins at "The Battle of the Champions'" undercard in Miami, to complete his 1982 boxing campaign.

In 1983, he avenged his loss to Hatcher, scoring a ten-round unanimous decision win at the Roberto Durán-Davey Moore world title fight undercard in Madison Square Garden. On September 15 of that year he lost to future world title challenger Charlie White Lighting Brown.

Retirement
After the Brown fight, Escalera announced his retirement from boxing once again. Shortly after, it was discovered that he had eyesight problems and had been fighting almost blinded for his last few fights.

Escalera now enjoys the fruits of his career in his farm in Puerto Rico. His son, Alfredo Escalera Jr., was once a boxer himself, who is based in Florida.

Legacy
The avid autograph signer left a boxing record of 53 wins, 14 losses and 3 draws, with 31 wins by knockout. His two fights with Argüello are considered by many to be boxing classics, Argüello-Escalera I making The Ring magazine's list of 100 greatest fights of all time at number 67, and Argüello-Escalera II making it at number 40.

See also

List of Puerto Ricans
List of Puerto Rican boxing world champions
Samuel Serrano

References

External links
 

1952 births
Living people
Super-featherweight boxers
World boxing champions
People from Carolina, Puerto Rico
Puerto Rican male boxers
Puerto Rican male professional wrestlers